Phaparthum is situated in the northern part of Syangja. It was a Village Development Committee (VDC) in Syangja District in the Gandaki Zone of central Nepal before being incorporated into the Aandhikhola Gaunpalika, along with five other VDCs. At the time of the 2011 Nepal census, it had a population of 2,412 living in 603 households.

References

External links
UN map of the municipalities of Syangja District

Populated places in Syangja District